Fritz!Box, stylised as FRITZ!Box, is a series of residential gateway devices produced by the German company AVM GmbH. In 2010 it was estimated the series had a market share of 68% of the digital subscriber line (DSL) consumer equipment in Germany.

Functionality 

Typical functionality of a Fritz!Box includes:

 a built-in broadband modem:
 a DSL modem (most models)
 a cable modem (6xxx series)
 a 3G or LTE modem (68xx series)
 a fibre broadband modem (54xx series)
 a built-in LAN-WAN router, usually with a network switch supporting Fast Ethernet or, in newer models, Gigabit Ethernet
 in nearly all models, a wireless access point:
 in the 2.4 GHz radio band, in accordance with IEEE 802.11b (11 Mbit/s), IEEE 802.11g (54 Mbit/s) and IEEE 802.11n (up to 450 Mbit/s) standards
 in many newer models, also in the 5 GHz radio band, supporting the IEEE 802.11a (54 Mbit/s), IEEE 802.11n (54 Mbit/s—450 Mbit/s) and IEEE 802.11ac (up to 1.27 Gbit/s) standards
 a PBX, particularly in the 7xxx series models:
 a built-in SIP client for internet telephony (VoIP)
 a DECT base station to connect cordless handsets
 a SIP server to connect SIP-compliant phones or software devices
 support for physical phones (extensions) connected via ISDN and/or analog interfaces
 an answering machine and software-based fax (receiving only)
 in most models since 2006, a USB port to connect external storage or printer which may also be used to connect a e.g. a 3G or 4G mobile modem
 a NAS and a DLNA/UPnP compliant media server in most models with newer firmware

Many Fritz!Boxes offer wireless repeater functionality which, in earlier firmware versions, was compatible with the IEEE 802.11-1999 standard wireless distribution system before being replaced with a proprietary system in more recent firmware versions.

IPv6 support was enabled from firmware version 4.90 onwards.

Fritz!Box devices operate under the control of Fritz!OS, a specialized Linux distribution, which provides a graphical web interface for user interaction.

Domestic versions
Fritz!Box devices with an integrated DSL modem come in three versions. The version for the German market uses an ISDN interface for voice. For the Austrian and Swiss markets the voice interface use traditional POTS and also has a German-language user interface. The international version has a multi-language web interface and provides support for POTS and usually ISDN for voice. While the international version supports both the most common ADSL Annex A POTS and ADSL Annex B ISDN, the German version offers hardware support for Annex B only, which is the sole standard used in Germany, with additional support for Annex J in newer models.

References

External links 

 

Broadband
Linux-based devices
Networking hardware
Telephony equipment